The constituency Esch-sur-Alzette elected members to Luxembourg's national legislature, the Chamber of Deputies, from 1848 until its abolition in 1919.  It was coterminous with the canton of Esch-sur-Alzette, in the south of the country.

After its abolition, it was replaced by Sud, which also included the canton of Capellen.

Members elected to represent Esch-sur-Alzette include Dominique Brasseur (1866–90), Xavier Brasseur (1902–12), and Léon Metz (1875–1918).

Chamber of Deputies of Luxembourg constituency
Defunct Chamber of Deputies of Luxembourg constituencies
History of Luxembourg (1815–1890)
History of Luxembourg (1890–1945)
1848 establishments in Luxembourg
1919 disestablishments in Luxembourg
Constituencies established in 1848
Constituencies disestablished in 1919